Federal Polytechnic, Bauchi is a polytechnic located in Bauchi, a traditional emirate and the capital of Bauchi State, North-East of Nigeria.

Background 
Federal Polytechnic Bauchi was established in July 1979 through Decree 33(Act 33) of the Federal Republic of Nigeria alongside six other institutions with a mandate to run full-time and/or part-time programmes on Technology, Applied Science, Commerce, Management and in other relevant fields needed for driving the development of Nigeria. It is situated at Gwallameji village, Bauchi - Dass Road. The current Rector of the polytechnic is Arch. Sanusi Waziri Gumau. The institutions which offers programmes leading to the award of National Diploma and Higher National Diploma was granted approval in 2020 to run nine degree courses in affiliation with Abubakar Tafewa Balewa University, Bauchi.

Courses 
The institution offers the following courses;

 Accountancy
 Agricultural and Environmental Engineering Technology
 Agricultural Technology
 Animal Health and Production Technology
Architectural Technology
Banking and Finance
Building Technology
Business Administration and Management 
Chemical Engineering Technology 
Computer Science 
Electrical/Electronic Engineering 
Estate Management and Valuation 
Food Technology 
Hospitality Management  
Leisure and Tourism Management 
Mass Communication 
Mechanical Engineering Technology 
Office Technology and Management 
Public Administration 
Quantity Surveying 
Science Laboratory Technology 
Statistics 
Surveying and Geo-informatics

See also 
List of Polytechnics in Nigeria

References

External links 
Welcome
Nigeria Federal Polytechnic Bauchi
Federal Polytechnic Bauchi

Federal polytechnics in Nigeria
Education in Bauchi State